Silence Becomes It is the debut album by Portuguese band Silence 4, released in June 1998. It was a huge success in Portugal, reaching a six-time platinum certification (240,000 units sold), but had less success internationally.

The album contains 15 songs, including a hidden track, and two versions of "A Little Respect" by Erasure. Most of the songs are in English, with only two in Portuguese: "Sextos Sentidos", a duet with Sérgio Godinho, and "Eu Não Sei Dizer". The songs deal with themes of love, pain, melancholy, loss, death, sorrow, loneliness and nostalgia – themes that are recurrent in Silence 4 and David Fonseca's solo career discography. Both "Borrow" and "My Friends" were highly successful singles in Portugal.

Track listing
Music and lyrics by David Fonseca, except where noted.
 "Goodbye Tomorrow" 
 "Borrow" 
 "Dying Young" (lyrics: Bruno Urbano)
 "Old Letters" 
 "Angel Song" 
 "My Friends" 
 "A (Very) Little Respect" (Vince Clark, Andy Bell)
 "Sextos Sentidos" (lyrics: Sérgio Godinho; music: Rui Costa) 
 "We" 
 "Breeders" (lyrics: Bruno Urbano)
 "Eu Não Sei Dizer" 
 "Cry" (music: Rui Costa)
 "A Little Respect" (Vince Clark, Andy Bell)
 "Teeth Against The Glass"
 "Sex Freak" (hidden track)

References

1998 debut albums
Silence 4 albums